Red Parlor Records (Red Parlor Entertainment Group) is an independent record label, founded in 2005 by Steven Goff and Jerry Krenach. Red Parlor is based in Norwalk, Connecticut and distributes its releases through Entertainment One in the US, Proper Music Distribution in the UK, and digital downloads worldwide through The Orchard/Sony Music.  The label's focus is roots, rock, and blues genres.  Red Parlor is known for records by Chris Whitley, David Olney, and Ezra Furman and the Harpoons.

Artists
 Chris Whitley & the Bastard Club
 David Olney
 Delta Moon
 Scott Ellison
 Ezra Furman and the Harpoons
 Cristina Vane
 Kasey Anderson
 Manda Mosher
 Matt Keating
 Carla Olson & Todd Wolfe – The Hidden Hills Sessions – May 2019

References

External links
 
 Entertainment One Music Group
 Proper Music Distribution
 The Orchard

American independent record labels